Daniel O'Reilly may refer to:

 Daniel O'Reilly (bishop) (1700–1778), Roman Catholic Bishop of Clogher in Ireland
 Daniel O'Reilly, comedian known under the stage name Dapper Laughs
Daniel O'Reilly (footballer) (born 1995), Irish soccer player
 Daniel O'Reilly (politician) (1838–1911), Irish-born U.S. Representative from New York, 1879-81